Stump may refer to:

Tree stump, the rooted remains of a felled tree
Stump (cricket), one of three small wooden posts which the fielding team attempt to hit with the ball

Places 
Stump, Kentucky, an unincorporated community in the United States
Stump Lake, a lake in British Columbia, Canada
Stump Mountain, a rock peak in Mac. Robertson Land, Antarctica
Stump River, tributary of the Pigeon River in Minnesota, United States
Stump Rock, a rock in King George Bay, South Shetland Islands, Antarctica

People
Stump (surname)
James "Stump" Cross, of Stump and Stumpy, American dance performers during the 1930s-50s
Stump Edington (1891–1969), American baseball player of the early 20th century
Stump Evans (1904–1928), American jazz saxophonist from the early 20th century
Stump Merrill (born 1944), American baseball manager
Stump Mitchell (born 1959), American football player and coach
Stump Monroe, drummer of the Scottish rock band The Almighty
Stump Wiedman (1861–1905), American baseball player during the 19th century

Other
 The remains of a limb after amputation
 A coastal landform which forms when a stack (geology) is eroded
Stump (band), a band from Cork, Ireland and London, England
Stump (drawing), an artists' drawing tool made of rolled paper
USS Stump (DD-978), a Spruance-class destroyer
Smooth muscle tumor of uncertain malignant potential, a uterine tumor
Clussexx Three D Grinchy Glee (born 1998), 2009 "Best In Show" winner at the Westminster Dog Show, nicknamed Stump

See also 
STUMP (disambiguation)
Stump v. Sparkman, United States Supreme Court decision on judicial immunity
Stump Pond (disambiguation)
Stump speech
Stumpy (disambiguation)
Stumped (disambiguation)
Stumpwm, an X window manager written in Common Lisp

Stomp (disambiguation)